Kostadin Velkov (born 26 March 1989) is a Bulgarian professional footballer, who plays as a defender for Balkan Botevgrad. His is the son of former footballer and manager Anton Velkov.

Career
In June 2017, Velkov signed with Slavia Sofia.

In May 2018, he joined German Regionalliga side Chemnitzer FC.

In December 2020, Velkov returned to Slavia Sofia where he spent a year before signing with Balkan Botevgrad in January 2022.

Honours
Slavia Sofia
 Bulgarian Cup: 2017–18

References

External links
 
 Career Statistics at sportal.bg

1989 births
Living people
Footballers from Sofia
Bulgarian footballers
Association football fullbacks
Association football central defenders
First Professional Football League (Bulgaria) players
Second Professional Football League (Bulgaria) players
Regionalliga players
Neftochimic Burgas players
FC Pomorie players
Akademik Sofia players
PFC Chernomorets Burgas players
PFC Slavia Sofia players
Würzburger Kickers players
FC Lokomotiv 1929 Sofia players
Chemnitzer FC players
Atlas Delmenhorst players
Bulgarian expatriate footballers
Bulgarian expatriate sportspeople in Germany
Expatriate footballers in Germany